

Buildings and structures

Buildings
 About 1160 – Rebuilding of Notre-Dame of Laon begun.
 1160
 Al-Salih Tala'i Mosque built in Cairo, Fatimid Caliphate.
 Rebuilding of Caen Cathedral begun.
 Notley Abbey is founded and the Augustinian Monastery built.
 1162 – Coimbra Cathedral begun.
 1163
 Thousand Pillar Temple of Warangal built in the Kakatiya Empire.
 Construction of Notre Dame in Paris begun.
 1164 – Golden Gate (Vladimir) completed.
 1165
 Liuhe Pagoda of Hangzhou, China rebuilt.
 Dhammayangyi Temple built in Bagan, Pagan Kingdom.
 1167
 Nore Stave Church, Norway, built.
 Earliest likely date for construction of building much later known as Marlipins Museum in Shoreham-by-Sea, England, commencing.
 1168
 Uvdal Stave Church, Norway, built.
 Jiangnan Examination Hall, Nanjing, China, built.

Births

Deaths

References

12th-century architecture
1160s works